Patricia "Patty" Marie Jervey (born March 29, 1964) is an American former rugby union player. She was a member of the Eagles squad to win the inaugural 1991 Women's Rugby World Cup. The 2006 Women's Rugby World Cup was her last appearance for the Eagles. Retiring with 178 points and 38 tries, Jervey is considered one of the ten greatest North American women rugby players.

Jervey was inducted into the IRB Hall of Fame on November 18, 2014. She was one of six women to be inducted.

References

Living people
American female rugby union players
United States women's international rugby union players
World Rugby Hall of Fame inductees
1964 births
21st-century American women